David Haskell may be:
David Haskell, 1948-2000, American actor
David G. Haskell, British-American biologist
David Haskell (editor), American editor